Rafael Francisco Osejo was a Nicaraguan educator who governed Costa Rica in March 1823.

Biography

Born around 1790, possibly in the indigenous community of Sutiava, in the vicinity of León. Do not know the names of their parents, or your mother's maiden name, although some sources mention this as Escamilla.
Indian and African blood was, as he is mentioned as mestizo, mulatto or zambo. Not married, but in Carthage had an illegitimate son who died teenager.

Education

He graduated BA in Philosophy at the University of León. The House Teaching of St. Thomas, located in San Jose, Costa Rica, in 1829 was awarded the degree of Bachelor of Civil Law.

Labor educator and academic

He moved in 1814 to San Jose, Costa Rica, to impart lessons of Philosophy (Humanities) in the House Teaching of St. Thomas, where he was appointed Rector in May of that year, a month after starting his work teaching. He played the Recoría until February 1815, but remained in charge of the department of Philosophy.
In 1817 he moved to Carthage, where he taught philosophy lessons. His pupils included Maria Oreamuno Francisco Bonilla and Joaquín Bernardo Calvo Rosales.
In July 1824 he was appointed teacher of first letters in the House Education and in 1830 Thomas Professor of Philosophy at that institution.

Public life

The bachelor Osejo played some public office in Costa Rica in the last years of Spanish rule. In 1819 he was appointed as a member of the Consular Court, in 1820 the City of Ujarrás counsel was appointed and in 1821 the city of Carthage was appointed to serve on the Board of Health of that city.
In 1820 he starred in a serious conflict with the Subordinate Political Head of Costa Rica Juan Manuel de Cañas -Trujillo, who objected to adopt a position Osejo a speech at the swearing-acts the Constitution of Cádiz in Carthage .

Performance policy at the time of Independence
Policy had an outstanding performance in Costa Rica in the early years of independence and was one of the most important figures of groups sympathetic to a Republican and adversaban annexation to Mexican Empire of Iturbide.
City Council Ujarrás nominated him as a representative on the Board of Legacies of Peoples which met in November 1821 under the presidency of Nicolas Carrillo and Aguirre, but even if he was elected Secretary of the Board, his credential was canceled. During the year 1822 turned away from politics and devoted himself to mining in the mountains of Avocado.
In February 1823, developed a highly active against annexation to Mexico and in favor of the accession of Costa Rica to Colombia. He was elected as Member Provincial Congress met in constituent Carthage on March 3, 1823 and 8th of that month decided the separation of Costa Rica the Mexican Empire. He served for a time as Secretary of the Congress.

President of the Delegation of Costa Rica
On 14 March 1823 the Provincial Congress elected Francisco Rafael Osejo to be one of the members of the Delegation of Costa Rica, board of three members and two alternates who should take power to replace the presiding Superior Governing Board Jose Lombardo and Alvarado Santos. The other two members were owners Manuel María de Peralta and Lopez del Corral and Morales Bonilla Hermenegidlo. As deputies were elected Alejandro Garcia-Escalante Juan Nava and Jose Bonilla and Herdocia.
The council began its work on 20 March 1823 and at the same meeting elected inaugural President Rafael Francisco Osejo. His rule was brief, as the March 29 a military coup led by the monarchist leader Joaquin Oreamuno and Muñoz of Trinidad deposed authorities and broke the constitutional order. Rafael Francisco Osejo was chased by monarchists and had to flee to San Jose.

Performance post-independence political
After the fall of the monarchy, and after some incidents, Rafael Francisco Osejo returned in July 1823 to take his seat in the Constituent Assembly, but was canceled in August his credentials as a deputy and the following month he was imprisoned for have suspicions that members of the council had been in conturbenio with monarchists coup. However, on September 28, the court which will hear the monarchists absolved of all blame to Osejo.
In December 1825 he was elected as a judge of the Supreme Court of Costa Rica, but declined the position. In early 1828 he was Trustee Attorney San Jose and in 1828-1830 was MP for Ujarrás. He was the promoter of the call Aprílea Act, which separated Costa Rica Central American Federation from 1829 to 1831.
From 1831 to 1833 he was MP for Alajuela and during several months of 1831 was President of the Legislative Assembly. He was one of the promoters of the idea of a regular rotation of the authorities, which materialized in 1834 with the controversial issue of the Ambulance Act . Thanks to his efforts in 1832 issued the first law on compulsory primary education.
In August 1833 he was appointed State specific counter and in October of that year he was elected as a deputy judge of the Supreme Court of Costa Rica. In December following, the Eastern Department chose Costa Rica as American federal Congressman, but in May 1834 was declared void your credential. After federal deputy was Nueva Segovia (1835-1836) and Leon (1836-1837). In 1838 he was Chief Political San Salvador and in 1847 he was Commissioner of Nicaragua in Honduras.

See also
Miguel de Bonilla y Laya-Bolívar

Costa Rican politicians
Nicaraguan emigrants to Costa Rica
Year of birth missing
Year of death missing